Wieprz ,) is a village in the administrative district of Gmina Zalewo, within Iława County, Warmian-Masurian Voivodeship, in northern Poland.

Notable residents
 Dietrich Stobbe (1938–2011), politician, former mayor of West-Berlin

References

Wieprz